The CEDICT project was started by Paul Denisowski in 1997 and is maintained by a team on mdbg.net under the name CC-CEDICT, with the aim to provide a complete Chinese to English dictionary with pronunciation in pinyin for the Chinese characters.

Content 

CEDICT is a text file; other programs (or simply Notepad or egrep or equivalent) are needed to search and display it. This project is considered a standard Chinese-English reference on the Internet and is used by several other Chinese-English projects.  The Unihan Database uses CEDICT data for most of its information about character compounds, but this is auxiliary and is explicitly not a part of the main Unicode database.

Features:
 Traditional Chinese and Simplified Chinese
 Pinyin (several pronunciations)
 American English (several)
 , it had 119,494 entries in UTF-8.

The basic format of a CEDICT entry is:
 Traditional Simplified [pin1 yin1] /American English equivalent 1/equivalent 2/
 漢字 汉字 [han4 zi4] /Chinese character/CL:個|个/

Example of a simple egrep search:
 $ egrep -i 有勇無謀 cedict.txt
 有勇無謀 有勇无谋 [you3 yong3 wu2 mou2] /bold but not very astute/

History

Related projects 
CEDICT has shown the way to some other projects:

 HanDeDict (~156,000 Chinese entries)
 CFDICT (~44,000 entries) for French
 Some older CEDICT data is also found in the Adsotrans dictionary.
 February 2012: ChE-DICC, the Spanish-Chinese free dictionary starts (currently beta)
 May 2017: CHDICT (11,000 entries) for Hungarian 
 CC-Canto is Pleco Software's addition of Cantonese language readings in Jyutping transcription to CC-CEDICT
 Cantonese CEDICT features Cantonese language readings in Yale transcription and has Cantonese-specific words, many of which were taken from "A Dictionary of Cantonese Slang" in possible copyright infringement.

References

External links 
 CC-CEDICT Editor Project home page
 more information on the formatting of CC-CEDICT
 MDBG free online Chinese–English dictionary uses CC-CEDICT, supports adding / editing entries and offers recent CC-CEDICT downloads.
 Flashonary is a Chinese-English Dictionary with integrated flashcards that uses CC-CEDICT.
 Example of CEDICT data for the han character " 中 ", use by Unihan (Section "Chinese Compounds")
 Chinese Dictionaries Discussion group about Chinese->"foreign language" dictionaries
 The homepage of Paul Denisowski, the founder of CEDICT
  www.clearchinese.com uses CEDICT
 Mandarin Text Project uses CEDICT
 HanDeDict @ Zydeo: Open-source Chinese-German dictionary
 CHDICT kínai-magyar szótár: Open-source Chinese-Hungarian dictionary 
 Zhonga Chinese-English dictionary with handwriting recognition and pronunciation, uses CEDICT.
HSK.HELP uses CEDICT

Chinese dictionaries
Translation dictionaries